Harsud railway station is a railway station, situated at Harsud, Madhya Pradesh. Its station code is HRD. It serves Harsud city. The station consists of two platforms, neither well sheltered. It lacks many facilities including water and sanitation. Old station is presently defunct. 
Old Harsud station was submerged under the waters of the Indirasagar Dam in July 2004. Due to this the existing railway line between Itarsi Junction railway station(station code ET) & Khandwa Junction railway station(station code KNW) was abandoned & dismantled. The old railway line still exist from Talvadiya Junction railway station(station code TLV) to Singaji railway station(station code SJ) connecting Indirasagar Dam Thermal Power Station.

See also 
 Indirasagar Dam 
 Harsud
 List of railway stations in India
 Itarsi
 Khandwa

References

External links 
 West Central Railway Official website
 Indira Sagar Dam Wikimapia

Defunct railway stations in India
Railway stations closed in 2004
Bhopal railway division
Railway stations in Khandwa district